Kim Hyeong-jun (born August 8, 1968) is a South Korean film director, screenwriter and producer.

Filmography

Film

See also 
 List of Korean-language films

References

External links 
 
 

South Korean film producers
South Korean film directors
South Korean screenwriters
1968 births
Living people